A borrowed chord (also called mode mixture, modal mixture, substituted chord, modal interchange, or mutation) is a chord borrowed from the parallel key (minor or major scale with the same tonic). Borrowed chords are typically used as "color chords", providing harmonic variety through contrasting scale forms, which are major scales and the three forms of minor scales. Chords may also be borrowed from other parallel modes besides the major and minor mode, for example D Dorian with D major. The mixing of the major and minor modes developed in the Baroque period.

Borrowed chords are distinguished from modulation by being brief enough that the tonic is not lost or displaced, and may be considered brief or transitory modulations and may be distinguished from secondary chords as well as altered chords. According to Sheila Romeo, "[t]he borrowed chord suggests the sound of its own mode without actually switching to that mode."

Common borrowed chords 

Sheila Romeo explains that "[i]n theory, any chord from any mode of the scale of the piece is a potential modal interchange or borrowed chord. Some are used more frequently than others, while some almost never occur."

In the minor mode, a common borrowed chord from the parallel major key is the Picardy third.

These chords are shown below, in the key of C major.

These chords are shown below.

Chord progressions may be constructed with borrowed chords, including two progressions common in rock music, I–VII–VI–VII, common everywhere, and I–VI–IV, used by bands like Genesis, Yes, and Nirvana. VII is from Mixolydian and VI is found in both Aeolian and Phrygian. The VII–I cadence with VII substituting for V is common, as well as II–I, III–I, and VI–I. In popular music, the major triads on the lowered third (III), sixth (VI) and seventh (VII) scale degrees are common.

Borrowed chords have typical inversions or common positions, for example ii6 and ii, and progress in the same manner as the diatonic chords they replace except for VI, which progresses to V(7).

See also
Aeolian harmony
Diatonic function
Harmonic major

References

External links

"Mode Mixture", Robert J. Frank (2000), Theory on the Web.
 and 
"Glossary: Terms Used in Writing Skills", Berklee.
Mike Campese. Guest Column: "Modal Interchange", Guitar Nine Records.
"Altered Chords in Jazz: Modal Interchange 0 –Altered Chords", Taming the Saxophone.

Chord progressions
Chords
Chromaticism